Tweeza, also Touiza or Tiwizi, is the term used in north Africa to designate the cooperation in a Sufi and cultural heritage in which a group from the tariqa or zawiya in a community or village gathers and cooperates in order to contribute to the achievement of charitable work, help the needy or the poor, build a house for a person or a mosque, clean a cemetery, village, or mosque, or harvest wheat fields and olive trees.

Presentation
The Tweeza is reflected in the village societies revolving around the Sufi zawiyas by voluntary action of cleaning, weeding, collecting waste and other rubbish as well as the planting of fruit and ornamental trees.

This collective and voluntary activity of the murids is thus initiated to rehabilitate scrub cemeteries, which represents a gesture of awareness which implies a surge of solidarity from the citizens of the entire village.

This altruistic participation results in the donation of quality shrubs from botanical nurseries, especially during the rainy season despite the unfavorable climatic conditions.

This action maintains the concept of Tweeza and rehabilitates it in the form of a voluntary service which was once practiced everywhere in the rural and village world, and which must be protected and preserved from the tendency to disappear over time due to modernity and urbanization.

The Tweeza supposes the union or the conjugation of the efforts of the "Thadjmaath" to carry out works of common interest such as the plowing and sowing campaigns, the construction of mosques, zawiyas and medersas.

It is also a form of mutual aid to support the underprivileged groups when it comes to building homes by reducing and mitigating the resulting financial charges.

This is how the Tweeza consolidates the bonds of friendship, fraternity and solidarity between rural citizens in the popular mountain neighborhoods and cities and in the suburbs and outskirts of urbanized cities.

Harvesting olives

During the end of autumn and the beginning of winter, all the women of the villages meet with their children to collect together in turn all the olives, a kind of Tweeza, all in a good-natured atmosphere by reciting  songs in chorus.

As every year, the inhabitants of these steep regions celebrate the olive picking by the Tweeza and festivals that last all the month of December and extend until January to welcome the Berber New Year called Yennayer.

Women and men are mobilized to make these festivities a success, which reinforces the spirit of solidarity between the villagers, especially at the end of the day around a large dish of couscous.

For guests from outside the village, honey and grape pancakes are offered in these olive-growing regions where the Tweeza accompanies the picking of olives in a ceremonial climate, where it is the village Amin who gives the signal for galling.

The Tweeza troop then moves, from olive grove to olive grove during each day, and in the evening, in each dechra, it is a night of party with meals and sweets embellished by songs in honor of the tree of the blessed olive tree.

See also

 Zawiyas in Algeria
 Mawlid
 Mawsim
 Yennayer
 Ziyarat
 Fantasia
 Marabout
 Saint
 Barakah
 Sebiba
 Wezeea

References

Sufism
Islamic terminology
Religious festivals
Sufism in Algeria
Algerian culture
Berber culture
Berber mythology
Rituals
Festivals in Algeria
Mawlid